David Hughes (born Nicholas David Hughes on 6 July 1978) was an Irish cricketer. He was a right-handed batsman and right-arm medium-pace bowler who played for Hertfordshire. He was born in Dublin.

Hughes, who made a single appearance for Hampshire Second XI in 1997, and two appearances in 1999 for Surrey Second XI, made his only List A appearance during the 2000 NatWest Trophy, against Cambridgeshire. From the opening order, Hughes scored a duck with the bat, and took bowling figures of 0-34.

External links
David Hughes at Cricket Archive 

1978 births
Living people
Hertfordshire cricketers
Irish cricketers
Cricketers from Dublin (city)